Ladislao Pablo Győri (born on July 13, 1963, in Buenos Aires, Argentina) is an Argentine engineer, digital and visual artist, essayist and poet, most known as the creator of Virtual Poetry in 1995, which has been described as "of utmost significance in advancing literature as sculptural object in electronic space". He has been described as one of the rare "poet-practitioners dedicated to 3-D art".

Life and career

Győri was born in 1963, in Buenos Aires, where he lives. In 1989, he graduated as electronic engineer at the National Technological University of Buenos Aires.

His first computational and literary activities date to 1983. Győri made experiences with computer music and voice synthesis, and works on Computer 3D art since 1984.

After his meeting in 1986 with Gyula Kosice, Győri subsequently experimented with painting and poetry, and became interested in non-representative and rigorous geometry formulations. The study of the paintings of Rhod Rothfuss led him to work, since 1990, in the realization of Madí Turning Paintings-Relief (irregular frame) and 3D digital animations of these geometric structures.

Estiajes (1988), prefaced by Kosice and part of the significant mathematical tradition of the Argentine poetry, according to Fabio Doctorovich was published in 1994.
Poems, information theory and the computer assisted calculus of probability in the composition of the text, in order to change the usual syntax, restricting the redundant elements and postulating a strong nonlinear character (related to what Győri calls hyperdiscourse), and to qualify in bits the poetic information. This work deserved to be anthologized by Julio Ortega, professor of Hispanic Studies at Brown University. These verbal experiments advanced toward other formative fields of poetry in several still unpublished works from 1989 to 1993.

As assistant to sculptor Kosice from 1990 to 1995, Győri was responsible for the technical facts of Kosice's production. During the retrospective exhibition Kosice - Works 1944/1990 at the Museo Nacional de Bellas Artes (National Museum of Fine Arts) of Buenos Aires in 1991, Secuencia gráfica de una gota de agua (Graphic Sequence of a Drop of Water; a collaborative computer graphics work, 1990) was displayed. Győri participated, among others, in El árbol de la vida y su lenguaje (The Tree of Life and its Language), a remote controlled sculpture by Kosice which incorporates sonic elements, and their display through what is known as spectrum analyzer, by means of variable columns of water and light. This work was erected in Neuquén, the northwestern Argentine Patagonia in 1992.

Győri co-founded in 1994 the TEVAT group and co-wrote, the same year, the TEVAT Manifesto, together with the specialist in Semiotics and also engineer José E. García Mayoraz, and the aforementioned Kosice. Artificiality and virtual reality, art in cyberspace, studies of semantic fields, et cetera, and the diffusion of these new topics in the artistic world are an integral part of their proposal.

His research about the problem of synthetic space in virtual reality systems, related to previous art and literary works, establishing "previously unexamined correlations between objects and subjects", in words of Funkhouser, gave rise to "Virtual Poetry", a new conjunction between visual reality and poetry, included finally into his main project: the Digital Domain of Works, which was exhibited in 1995 at the Galileo Galilei Planetarium of Buenos Aires, together with the project entitled Art Criticism in Cyberspace,), an example of García Mayoraz's Vectorial Theory of Semantic Fields, originating from his multidisciplinary studies of Semiotics, information theory and both the human and the forthcoming artificial brain.

In 2002, e-stori.ar, a navigable 3D database project around Argentine national history, received an honorary mention from the Buenos Aires Museum of Modern Art.

In the last decade Győri also produced a series of books, always related to visual arts, writing and computer technology. In 2010, First 25 Visual Years was published: a full color illustrated anthology; a compendium of his activity between 1984 and 2009. Kosice y el arte tecnológico (Kosice and Technological Art) appeared on next year, inaugurating his Aero publishing initiative; Győri investigates there the relationship between all the Kosice's creative production and the theoretical thinking that comes from the Computer Age.

Works

Artworks (selection) 

 Pieces in CAD, still images, Psion VU-3D original version (1984-1985).
 Madí 3D Logo, digital still images (1986).
 Sculpture Projects, tempera and colored pencil on cardboard (1989).
 Sculpture Projects in CAD (1989).
 Alocución, polychromed sculpture in wood (1989).
 Graphic Sequence of a Drop of Water, in collaboration with Gyula Kosice, computer graphics (1990).
 Constructions, 3D digital models (1994).
 Pieces in CAD, 3D digital animation video (1995).
 Sculpture Project # 58, 3D digital animation video (1995).
 Virtual Reliefs, digital still images and 3D digital animation videos (1990-1995).
 Madí Relief-Paintings, enamel on wood (1990-1995).
 Visual poetry, including Sound Space (1992-1998)
 Art Criticism in Cyberspace, in collaboration with José E. García Mayoraz, 3D digital animation video (1995).
 Virtual Poems # 12 & 13, digital still images and 3D digital animation videos (1995).
 Homage to Edgardo A. Vigo, visual poem, tempera on cardboard (1996).
 Vpoems # 12 & 13, VRML models (1996).
 Virtual Poem # 14, digital still images and 3D digital animation video (1996).
 Digital works and projects for monumental sculptures in collaboration with G. Kosice (1999-2003).
 e-storia.ar, virtual reality project (2002).
 e-stori.ar/el_sur, virtual reality project (2003).
 Ensembles, 3D digital models (2006).
 hommage à e.a.vigo, 3D interactive poem (2007).
 Exographies, black and colored pencils and ballpoint pens on cardboard or paper (2010-2011).
 Objetos desbordantes (Overflowing Objects), 3D digital models (2012-2015).
 Object # 29, 3D printed object (2013).
 Technologyőri, digital visual composition (2014).
 Exoplaca053c, laser cut aluminium plate (2022).

Books 

 Estiajes (1994), 
 First 25 Visual Years (2010), 
 Kosice y el arte tecnológico (2011), 
 Maquinado aditivo en artes visuales (2013), 
 Notación para lenguaje inexistente (2014), 
 Exography (2017), 
 Lógica de sustracciones a un cuadrado (2019), 
 Impresiones oculares en una visita (2021),

References

External links 

 Ladislao Pablo Győri (English/Spanish); from 1984 up to 2003, official website.
 Aero (Spanish only).
 Postypographika (English/Spanish).

1963 births
20th-century Argentine poets
20th-century Argentine writers
20th-century Argentine male writers
20th-century short story writers
21st-century Argentine poets
21st-century Argentine writers
21st-century Argentine male writers
21st-century Argentine short story writers
Argentine artists
Argentine essayists
Argentine male poets
Argentine male short story writers
Argentine people of Hungarian descent
Writers from Buenos Aires
Living people
National Technological University alumni